Techno International Newtown, formerly Known as Techno India College Of Technology(TICT), is an engineering college in West Bengal, India. It is the seventh college established by the Techno India Group. It is affiliated with Maulana Abul Kalam Azad University of Technology(formerly known as West Bengal University of Technology) and its courses are approved by All India Council of Technical Education.

Admission
Admission to the B.Tech courses on the basis of West Bengal Joint Entrance Examination and Joint Entrance Examination. Admission to other courses are based on criteria decided by the Academic Council of the University.

Departments at TINT 

 Computer Science and Engineering
 Information Technology
 Electronics & Comm. Engg
 Electrical Engineering
 Mechanical Engineering
 Civil Engineering
 Applied Electronics & Instrumentation Engineering
 MCA/BCA
 BBA
 Basic Science and Humanities

Student life

Clubs 

 TINT PHOTOGRAPHY CLUB
 TINT Coding Club
 HRIDMAJHARE- TINT Music Club
 TINT Talkies - TINT Film & Drama Club
 LITWITS - TINT Literary Club

Technical Fest and Cultural Fest

Prabuddha
Prabuddha is the technical festival organized every year at the college.

Yagvik
Yagvik is the cultural festival organized every year at the college.
 In 2007 : Band performance by Prithibi and Parikrama (band).
 In 2008 : Band performance by Love Runs Blind, concert by Amit Sana.
 In 2011 : Band performance by Faridkot and Underground Authority.
 In 2012 : Band performance by Somlata Acharyya Chowdhury and The Aces, Prachir, EKA and SiXthVeda.
 In 2013 : Performance by Silajit Majumder and concert by Mohammad Irfan Ali.
 In 2014 : Band performance by Fossils (band) and performance by Anjan Dutt.
 In 2016 : Performance by Amit Mishra of Manwa Emotion Jaage fame from Dilwale (2015 film).
in 2019: Performance by Emon Chatterjee

Hostel 
There are separate hostels for boys and girls, which are located near the college. The boy's hostel is situated near by the Dlf IT-Park which is hardly five minutes from the college, and the girl's hostel is in Kaikhali, from where a college bus is available.

See also

References

External links

Official Website
Official Facebook Page
TINT Learning Management System
Maulana Abul Kalam Azad University of Technology

Engineering colleges in Kolkata
Colleges affiliated to West Bengal University of Technology
2005 establishments in West Bengal
Educational institutions established in 2005